The Kalmia Hills are a low mountain range of the Peninsular Ranges System, in northwestern Riverside County of southern California.

Geography
The range defines the northern side of the Moreno Valley landform, and is north of the city of Moreno Valley.

The Box Springs Mountains parallel them along the southwest, and the La Loma Hills and community of Grand Terrace are to the northwest.

Geology
Geologically, the Kalmia Hills are on the northeastern edge of the Perris Block formation, along the San Jacinto Fault Zone.

See also

References 

Mountain ranges of Riverside County, California
Peninsular Ranges
Moreno Valley, California
Hills of California
Mountain ranges of Southern California